Mark Allan Hoppus (born March 15, 1972) is an American musician, songwriter and producer best known as the bassist and co-lead vocalist for the rock band Blink-182, the only member to appear on every album. He is also part of the pop rock duo Simple Creatures.

Hoppus became interested in skateboarding and punk rock in junior high, and received a bass guitar from his father at the age of 15. After he moved to San Diego in 1992 to attend California State University San Marcos, his sister introduced him to Tom DeLonge, and they formed the band Blink-182 with drummer Scott Raynor. The band produced several rock recordings and toured exhaustively before signing to major label MCA to co-distribute their sophomore effort, 1997's Dude Ranch, which featured the Hoppus-penned hit "Dammit".

After replacing Raynor with Travis Barker, Blink-182 recorded Enema of the State (1999), which launched them to multi-platinum success. Two more records followed—the heavier Take Off Your Pants and Jacket (2001) and the more experimental untitled fifth album (2003)—before the band split in 2005 following internal tension. Hoppus continued playing with Barker in +44 in the late 2000s. Blink-182 subsequently reunited in 2009 and continue to record and tour worldwide.

Aside from his musical career, Hoppus has had multiple successes behind the recording console, producing records for groups such as Idiot Pilot, New Found Glory, The Matches, Motion City Soundtrack, and PAWS. He has previously co-owned two companies, Atticus and Macbeth Footwear, and created a new clothing line in 2012 named Hi My Name is Mark. Hoppus hosted a weekly podcast in 2005 through 2006, which returned in 2015, and he hosted his own television talk show, Hoppus on Music, from 2010 to 2012 on Fuse.

Early life
Hoppus was raised near Washington, D.C. before his family settled in Ridgecrest, California, a place he later described as "geniuses, scientists, physicists, and then just complete strung-out meth-heads". His maternal great-grandparents, Aaron and Lempi Orrenmaa, were Finnish immigrants from Laihia. His father Tex, like many in Ridgecrest, worked for the U.S. Department of Defense, designing missiles and bombs for the town's Navy testing center. 

Hoppus describes himself as "pretty mellow" until his parents divorced when he was eight, which had a "drastic, unsettling effect" on him. He said, "When my parents argued, it was always behind closed doors. I remember sitting outside my parents' room when I was seven years old, hearing the dulled voice of anger behind the door. It upset me a lot." Following these events, he spent two years shuffling between his parents' homes with sister Anne, until he and his father moved to Monterey. His father was often away earning a postgraduate degree in college. He later would describe his childhood as lonely, remarking, "[I] was living by myself in the fifth grade." His father introduced him to the music of The Beatles, Elton John and Billy Joel.

Hoppus describes himself as "pretty straight" until junior high, when he began skateboarding and listening to punk rock. In his early high school years, he lived in Fairfax, Virginia, attending nearby Annandale High School during his second year; he received his first bass guitar during this time and attended his first concert, They Might Be Giants, at the 9:30 Club shortly before his 16th birthday. He recalled, "I didn't know where I should stand or what I should do, so my friends and I bought some menthol cigarettes and smoked for the first time and tried to look as cool as we could. We probably looked like idiots." He received his first bass (a Mako) as a gift from his father, purchased at a local music shop in Annandale. He earned money for a set of amplifiers by helping him paint his house. Hoppus never took bass lessons, instead teaching himself by playing to bands such as the Descendents, The Cure, and Bad Religion. He has remarked that "Silly Girl" by the Descendents was the "song that made [him] fall in love with punk rock music [...] that song changed [his] life forever". He borrowed a cassette tape of The Cure's album Kiss Me, Kiss Me, Kiss Me from his friend Wendy Franklin the summer following junior high school, and was taken with the song "Just Like Heaven". 

Hoppus began to dress like Cure frontman Robert Smith, donning eyeliner and "occasionally bright red lipstick" to his high school classes; he later quipped, "This all went over exceedingly well with the faculty and staff in the small desert town where I grew up." Beginning in his first year, he gained solace through music of both The Cure and The Smiths. He played by himself and sang in the band Pier 69, primarily covering songs by The Cure, and recorded a live demo with a group named The Attic Children in 1988, featuring covers of The Cure songs. Hoppus returned to Ridgecrest in 1989, completing high school at Burroughs High School. In his teen years, a friend stole his mother's car in the middle of the night to pick him up; the two would sneak out to the desert and burn trees and any objects they could find.

After graduating from Burroughs High School in 1990, he began playing in a band called of All Things he formed with two friends, covering songs by Descendents, Social Distortion, and Bad Religion, as well as writing original punk numbers. The group primarily performed at friend's parties and bonfires, and once played Oasis, the local music venue. Hoppus left Ridgecrest in summer 1992 to attend college and get a job at a local music store in San Diego. He continued playing gigs with of All Things, returning on weekends. Eventually, his manager became suspicious of his weekend activities, as Hoppus had told him he worked with mentally disabled children in Ridgecrest, and refused to give him any time off on weekends. His "short-lived attempt" at college, studying at California State University, San Marcos, revolved around plans to become an English teacher. He recalls he "hated" college and his reasoning behind becoming a teacher involved sights set for educational reform. He dropped out in the early 1990s after "things began to take off with Blink-182" and lived with his mother for many of the early years of the band. Hoppus describes his mother as always supportive in his decisions to drop out of college and tour with Blink-182; however, he describes his father as "more realistic, [...] he said, 'Have something to fall back on.'" "I'm really fortunate that my mom always completely supported me, even to the point that I dropped out of college and lived at her house for five years before our band started to catch on," said Hoppus.

Music career

Blink-182

Early career

After moving to San Diego in the summer of 1992, Hoppus was reunited with his sister Anne Hoppus, to whom he expressed his desire to be in a band. Anne attended Rancho Bernardo High School, and had become friends with new student Tom DeLonge over the summer. In August 1992, Anne introduced the two, and Hoppus and DeLonge immediately began performing music in DeLonge's garage. To impress DeLonge, Hoppus climbed to the top of a streetlight outside of DeLonge's home – however, he broke both ankles on the way down, resulting in being in crutches for the next few weeks. DeLonge recalled the meeting in 2000: "When I first met Mark, we were running around naked, doing weird stuff. We were up skateboarding until late hours of the morning, antagonizing security guards, and we were just always having fun." DeLonge recruited old friend Scott Raynor from his days at Poway to become the drummer for the new band, named blink.

Hoppus and his girlfriend at this time lived in a basement apartment, barely scraping together funds to pay rent. With money in savings, Hoppus went out and bought his first professional equipment: a new amp and bass cabinet. He came home and his girlfriend proceeded to argue with him, angry that he spent money on something they did not need. "I just kept telling her that this was what mattered to me, this was my life," Hoppus recalled. She demanded he make a choice between the band and her, which resulted in Hoppus leaving the band shortly after formation. Shortly thereafter, DeLonge told Hoppus he had borrowed a four track recorder from a friend and was preparing to record a demo tape, which prompted Hoppus to break up with his girlfriend and return to the band. Flyswatter—a combination of original songs and punk covers—was recorded in Raynor's bedroom and landed the band their first shows. Three more demos were recorded over the course of 1993 and the band began performing its irreverent live show at local all-ages venue SOMA, which alerted local independent label Cargo Music. Cargo signed the band on a trial basis, and Hoppus was the only member to sign the contract, as DeLonge was at work at the time and Raynor was still a minor. During this time, Hoppus lived at home in San Diego at his mother's, where the band would prepare cassette demos and the entire family would fold cassette inserts. Raynor, whose parents moved to Reno, Nevada, stayed with Hoppus in summer 1994.

Blink's first album, Cheshire Cat (1995), was a strong seller for the independent band and would come to be regarded as iconic within the skate punk scene. In 1995, the band signed on for their first national tour, which extended as far as the East Coast. The band purchased their own tour van and embarked on the GoodTimes tour with Unwritten Law, Sprung Monkey and 7 Seconds. The band slowly built a young, devoted following with indie recordings and an endless series of performances and various clubs and festivals. MCA Records signed the band in 1996 and would co-distribute their next release, the sophomore effort Dude Ranch. Hoppus penned the record's lead single, "Dammit", which became a nationwide rock radio hit single as the band toured on the Vans Warped Tour.

Multi-platinum success and +44
Hoppus grew increasingly lonely on these tours, having no significant other while other band members did. The exhaustive schedule created tensions within the band, who would fire Raynor in the summer of 1998 in mysterious circumstances never fully explained. With new drummer Travis Barker behind the kit, the trio hit the studio with producer Jerry Finn and recorded Enema of the State, which launched the band's career, catapulting them into the "stratosphere of pop music" and solidifying them as the biggest pop punk act of the era. Three singles were released from the record—"What's My Age Again?", "All the Small Things", and "Adam's Song"—that crossed over into Top 40 radio format and experienced major commercial success. Hoppus got married in 2000 (see Personal life) just before the band prepared to record their highly anticipated follow-up, Take Off Your Pants and Jacket (2001). Hoppus felt complacent creatively but DeLonge felt otherwise, creating post-hardcore side project Box Car Racer to experiment with ideas he deemed unsuitable for blink.

Hoppus felt betrayed (Barker was also in Box Car Racer) and a rift developed between Hoppus and DeLonge that would carry on into the band's future. When the band regrouped to record their next record in 2003, all of the members had become fathers (or, in the case of Barker, becoming one) and the trio took a darker, more "mature" direction with their untitled fifth studio album, infusing experimentalist elements into their usual pop punk sound partially inspired by Box Car Racer. Unresolved feelings from that project would arise in late 2004 when the band began to argue regarding their future and recording process. The February 2005 break-up of blink-182 affected Hoppus greatly: "I had no idea what to do. After blink broke up I had such a loss of identity and purpose. I just had a giant sense of void." Hoppus then began to work on even darker, electronic demos with Barker in his kitchen. He also turned to producing, hitting the studio with Motion City Soundtrack to record Commit This to Memory (2005). In October 2005, Hoppus and Barker purchased a studio together (named Opra Music), where they would bring together a full band to expand upon those electronic demos, creating +44's When Your Heart Stops Beating (2006).

The record, by all accounts, sold poorly and received mixed reviews in the music press. Hoppus and Barker continued touring on the Honda Civic Tour and commenced work on a second +44 album. The August 2008 death of friend and producer Jerry Finn deeply affected Hoppus, who referred to Finn as a lifelong friend and mentor. The following month, Barker and collaborator Adam Goldstein (aka DJ AM), were involved in a plane crash that killed four people, leaving Barker and Goldstein the only survivors. Hoppus immediately boarded a plane to the burn unit, and DeLonge reconnected with the duo under the tragic circumstances. When the band regrouped in the studio for a day, past acrimony vanished with near immediacy. Regarding these experiences, Hoppus wrote, "The events of the past two months supersede everything that happened before. Life is too short." In February 2009, the band's official website was updated with a statement: "To put it simply, We're back. We mean, really back. Picking up where we left off and then some. In the studio writing and recording a new album. Preparing to tour the world yet again. Friendships reformed. 17 years deep in our legacy."

Reunion and recent events

The band reconnected musically and emotionally on the reunion tour, but were still "on eggshells" throughout the recording of their comeback album. The recording's delay was due to the way the band chose to work – in bits and pieces, alone and together, in a pair of California studios – in addition to each member's busy schedules. The band struggled to record juggling individual priorities; in the case of Hoppus, his new television show Hoppus on Music required him flying to New York once a week. Hoppus moved to London with his family late in the recording process, also complicating matters. The band's comeback album, Neighborhoods (2011), debuted high but undersold label expectations, and Blink-182 parted with Interscope Records in 2012, going independent for their next release, the EP Dogs Eating Dogs.

The band toured Australia in February 2013 without Barker, who did not attend due to his fear of flying (Brooks Wackerman of Bad Religion filled in for him). The band toured the United States in September 2013, where they planned to begin writing songs for their seventh studio album. "We're hoping to head into the studio next year [and to have the] album out in late spring/early summer," Hoppus told Kerrang!. In the interim, Hoppus began recording songs with frequent engineer and producer Chris Holmes that the duo plan to release by the end of the year. "We probably have seven or eight songs in various stages of completion," Hoppus remarked in August 2013. "I still haven't chosen a name [for the project] yet; we still have to figure that out. It's like guitar mixed with electronics…. at this point." Hoppus will share lead vocals with Holmes on the tracks. On April 25, 2014, Hoppus announced, via Twitter, the name of the band as Nothing and Nobody. Their first album is expected to be released in the "not-too-distant future".

In 2015, blink-182 played three shows in California. With the departure of Tom DeLonge from the band, Matt Skiba of Alkaline Trio, filled in. It was the first time Hoppus performed under the name "blink-182" without DeLonge by his side. The shows were on March 18, March 20, and March 22. Hoppus later hired Skiba full-time, and blink-182 recorded two albums with him, 2016's California and 2019's Nine before DeLonge returned to the band in 2022.

Hoppus has also performed DJ sets at Emo Nite in Los Angeles on several occasions from 2015 to 2017.

In non-musical endeavors, Hoppus launched his own clothing line, Hi My Name is Mark (stylized as "HiMyNameIsMark"), in July 2013.

Simple Creatures
On January 24, 2019, Hoppus announced he was forming a new group with Alex Gaskarth of All Time Low called Simple Creatures. A debut song called "Drug" was released in January, followed by their first EP, Strange Love, on March 29, 2019. Their second EP, Everything Opposite, was released on October 11, 2019.

Musical style

Songwriting
Hoppus primarily writes most of his songs on an acoustic guitar. He is self-taught, "and consequently I don't have the best technique", he remarked in 2004. "I think you would learn how to paint by painting, rather than reading books about painters or painting and I think it's the same with music. You learn by doing and getting influences from other artists."

Equipment

Bass guitars
For Blink-182's earliest concerts and demo recordings, Hoppus used a standard Fender Precision Bass. On the albums Cheshire Cat and Dude Ranch and their respective tours, he switched to using a Music Man StingRay as his primary bass. While recording Enema of the State, Hoppus used his StingRay as well as a Fender Precision and Jazz Bass. 

After primarily recording with the two Fender basses, Hoppus merged the designs together for the Fender Mark Hoppus Signature Jazz Bass, which debuted in 2000. On the initial model, the pickup, a Seymour Duncan Quarter Pound (SPB-3), was in its standard position with the E and A pole pieces on top and the D and G pole pieces on the bottom. However, when Fender updated the model in 2006, the pole pieces were reversed, giving it a fuller sound. 

In 2015, Hoppus switched to Fender Jaguar Basses with the same configuration as his 2006 signature model. However, he still occasionally used his original signature Jazz Basses and used them extensively alongside his Jaguar Basses upon Tom DeLonge's return to the band on their upcoming album and 2023 tour.

Hoppus has been a longtime user of Ernie Ball strings and his instruments are strung with Super Slinky Bass strings (.45-.100).

Amps
For live sound, Hoppus originally plugged his basses into three Ampeg SVT Classic bass heads running into two Ampeg 8x10 SVT bass cabs. Prior to the use of the all-tube SVT Classic heads, Hoppus used two Ampeg SVT-4 Pro heads which only feature a tube preamp. After the Neighborhoods album release, Hoppus used New Vintage amplifiers and cabinets, specifically the Undertow 300 amplifier and NW 8x10 bass cabinets. In 2016, he began using Kemper Profiler amps in concert.

Non-musical endeavors
Hoppus and Tom DeLonge co-owned two companies, Atticus and Macbeth Footwear, Hoppus has since sold his share in both companies; as well as loserkids.com.

Mark Hoppus has made several acting appearances in films and television, often as part of blink-182. He first appeared as a member of a garage band in the hugely successful teen comedy American Pie (1999) with bandmates Tom DeLonge and Travis Barker, (Though the film's credits list Barker as Scott Raynor.) He appeared again with DeLonge, singing a cover of Jan and Dean's "Dead Man's Curve" in the CBS television movie Shake, Rattle and Roll: An American Love Story (1999). Hoppus and DeLonge hosted the MTV show You Idiot! in 1999. The band appeared in the Two Guys and a Girl episode "Au Revoir, Pizza Place" in 1999, as well as an animated cameo in The Simpsons episode "Barting Over" in 2003. The band made a guest appearance on MADtv in 2002, in a segment titled "Leave It to Blink-182", spoofing 1950s-era sitcoms. Hoppus was a guest actor on an episode of the show Haunted in 2002. In 2011, he appeared in the documentary film The Other F Word. Hoppus was featured as a panelist on the comedy show Never Mind the Buzzcocks in 2012.

He also wrote columns for Risen Magazine's March/April and May/June 2005 issues entitled "Beyond Us". Mark Hoppus has been confirmed to be a part of a documentary about modern punk music entitled One Nine Nine Four. The film was due to be released in 2009 but has been delayed.

In 2010, he joined the 9th annual Independent Music Awards judging panel to assist independent musicians' careers.

Mark Hoppus worked to help relief efforts in Japan after the devastating earthquake and tsunami Tōhoku. He announced that his group Blink-182, will be auctioning off items to benefit the American Red Cross on EBay. "So sad for what's happening in Japan. Gonna dig in the bins & find some old blink-182 items to auction for the Red Cross" said Mark. The items auctioned off included the original lyrics sheet to the group's hits "The Rock Show" and "Adam's Song", Bad Religion autographed cymbal, hand-painted 1.5 FT tall Bunny, blink-182 tour backstage pass, stickers, postcard/magnets, trading cards, the band's dressing room sign from the 2000 VMAs, and Hoppus orange sweater from the "Dammit" music video. Among the 33 items auctioned off for charity he totaled 4,318 dollars.

HiMyNameIsMark (2005, 2012–present)

"HiMyNameIsMark" is a podcast that was set up in the wake of the Blink-182 hiatus by Hoppus, and can be found at HiMyNameIsMark.com. Every few weeks he released a show of songs by underground bands, interviews with band members and/or friends, and reminisces about happenings in his life. He is often joined on the show by his friends Chris Holmes (+44's engineer) and James Ingram (+44's assistant engineer). Hoppus has also created various side projects including "Hopp on Popp" where he reviews one of his favorite up and coming artists, some of which have been Matt & Kim, fun., and Japandroids. In late 2014, the podcast returned from a hiatus.

Hoppus on Music (2010–2012)

On June 22, 2010, Fuse announced that Hoppus would be hosting his own weekly, one-hour television series entitled A Different Spin with Mark Hoppus. In relation to the press release, Hoppus stated "I am stoked to join the Fuse family and have a show where I can talk about a topic that I'm passionate about, music. More importantly, I'm excited to force millions of people to watch me on a weekly basis on national television." According to Fuse senior vice president of programming and development Sal LoCurto, "A Different Spin with Mark Hoppus was developed to complement the wide variety of music programming on Fuse – including live concerts, festival coverage and in-depth interview series with the biggest names in music. On August 5, Hoppus revealed the co-host of the show would be comedian Amy Schumer."

The show focuses on music news, fun panel discussions and special reports from the show's correspondents. The show also features musical performances by both mainstream and emerging bands. The show officially premiered on September 16, 2010, on Fuse. The show's second season premiered in March 2011 and the show was re-titled Hoppus on Music.

Personal life
Hoppus met former MTV talent executive Skye Everly in August 1999, at a rehearsal for the music video of "All the Small Things", and they later married on December 2, 2000. According to a 2004 interview, she initially refused to date Hoppus. He elaborated, "Tom [DeLonge] always used to embarrass me. Any girl he'd talk to, he'd say, 'Hey, you wanna go on a date with Mark?' He asked Skye, my wife, who looked at me and said, 'No.' That's how it all started." Their son, Jack, was born in 2002.

In 2004, he revealed that he votes for the Libertarian Party. He said, "To me, it means to respect other people and let them do their own thing. The government is there to help people but not control them." A 2000 Rolling Stone profile noted that he "pray[s] every night", and he said of his religious views in 2005, "It's amazing to me that anyone can say that one thing is right. [...] To draw lines over something that none of us on earth could possibly comprehend seems like a waste of time."

In 2011, Hoppus and his family relocated to the Mayfair area of London, as Blink-182 were in the process of completing their sixth album, Neighborhoods. They remained in London until 2014, when they moved to Beverly Hills, California. As a resident of London, he enjoyed jogging in the city's parks and became a fan of Chelsea F.C. Hoppus is also a fan of the Los Angeles Rams.

Health issues
On June 23, 2021, Hoppus revealed that he was undergoing treatment for cancer after accidentally sharing a picture of himself undergoing chemotherapy treatment to his public Instagram Story. On July 11, he said that he was experiencing stage 4 diffuse large B-cell lymphoma. On September 29, Hoppus announced that he was declared cancer-free, and that he would be screened every 6 months in case the cancer returned.

Discography

With blink-182

 Buddha (1993)
 Cheshire Cat (1995)
 Dude Ranch (1997)
 Enema of the State (1999)
 Take Off Your Pants and Jacket (2001)
 blink-182 (2003)
 Neighborhoods (2011)
 Dogs Eating Dogs EP (2012)
 California (2016)
 Nine (2019)

With +44
 When Your Heart Stops Beating (2006)

With Simple Creatures
 Strange Love EP (2019)
 Everything Opposite EP (2019)

Collaborations
 "Until the Stars Fall" (with Richard Gibbs) on the soundtrack Fired Up! (2009)
 "Amoeba" (with Travis Barker) on the soundtrack Endless Bummer (2009)
 "In Transit" (with Pete Wentz) on the compilation Almost Alice (2010)

Guest appearances
 "My So Called Life" and "That Special Girl" on the album Look Forward to Failure by The Ataris (1998)
 "I'd Do Anything" on the album No Pads, No Helmets...Just Balls by Simple Plan (2002)
 "Elevator" on the album Box Car Racer by Box Car Racer (2002)
 "The Empire" on the compilation The Passion of the Christ: Songs by MxPx (2004)
 "Hangman" on the album Commit This to Memory by Motion City Soundtrack (2005)
 "Wrecking Hotel Rooms" on the album Panic by MxPx (2005)
 "Paper Doll" on the album White Heat by Renee Renee (2006)
 "Nightmare" on the album Changes by Vanilla Sky (2007)
 "Bitter Sweet Symphony", a cover of The Verve song, by Ace Enders and A Million Different People (2008)
 "Thank You & Goodnight" on the album What Are You So Scared Of? by Tonight Alive (2011)
 "Dementia" on the albumThe Midsummer Station by Owl City (2012)
 "Hate Your Guts" on the album McBusted by McBusted (2014)
 "Tidal Waves" on the album Future Hearts by All Time Low (2015)
 "Ready and Willing II" on the album Resurrection: Ascension by New Found Glory (2015)
 "Impermanent" on the album "No Grace" by PAWS (2016)
 "December (Again)" on the album December EP by Neck Deep (2016)
 "See You Around" on the album The Knife by Goldfinger (2017)
 "Not Every Dog Goes to Heaven (National Lampoon's Vacation)" on the album Dog Songs (2017)
 "Time Machine" on the album Living Proof by State Champs (2018)
 "Psycho" on the album Love Monster by Amy Shark (2018)
 "The Lighthouse" on the album Heartwork by The Used (2020)
 "Carhartts & Converse" by Super Whatevr (2020)
 "Growing Up" on the album Young Dumb Thrills by McFly (2020)
 "Find My Own Way" on the album Nonfiction by Arrested Youth (2021)
 "Parasocial" by Ricky Himself (2021)
 "Re-Entry" by A Day to Remember (2022)
 "Adding Up" on the album It's Fine by Smrtdeath (2022)
 "All I Wanted" on the album Love Sux by Avril Lavigne (2022)

References

Bibliography

External links

Hoppus on Music
Fuse

Living people
American baritones
American male singers
American punk rock singers
American punk rock bass guitarists
American male bass guitarists
Pop punk singers
American alternative rock musicians
Alternative rock singers
Alternative rock bass guitarists
Blink-182 members
Singers from California
People from Ridgecrest, California
20th-century American singers
21st-century American singers
Songwriters from California
American television hosts
American libertarians
20th-century American bass guitarists
21st-century American bass guitarists
American people of Finnish descent
Guitarists from California
+44 (band) members
Annandale High School alumni
1972 births